Cesi is an Italian surname. 

It may refer to the House of Cesi, a noble family of Umbrian origin.

To this belong:
Federico Cesi (1500–65), Italian Cardinal
Federico Cesi (1585–1630), Italian scientist
Paolo Emilio Cesi (1481–1537), Italian Cardinal
Pier Donato Cesi (1521–1586), Italian Cardinal
Pier Donato Cesi (1583–1656), Italian Cardinal

Further notable people with the surname include:

Bartolomeo Cesi (1556–1629) Italian baroque era painter
Bartolomeo Cesi (bishop) (–1537), Italian Roman Catholic bishop
Bartolomeo Cesi (cardinal) (1566–1621), Italian Roman Catholic cardinal
Beniamino Cesi (1845–1907), Italian concert pianist
Carlo Cesi (1622–82), Italian painter and engraver

Italian-language surnames